Christie Island is an island in the Mergui Archipelago and the southernmost point of Burma (Myanmar). It lies at the southern end of the archipelago  to the NNE of Ko Surin Nuea, and the Thai-Burmese oceanic border is located between these two islands.

The tallest is 325 meters high. Murray Island and Sanders Island are small rocky islets off its southern shores. Christie Island is part of the Alladin Islands subgroup. It features a clearing at the top with a helicopter pad and small dusty military base.

1998 massacre
In May 1998, Colonel Zaw Min, landed on Christie Island and found 59 Burmese nationals living there to gather wood and bamboo, in violation of Burmese law. General Than Shwe ordered they were to be "eliminated" and all were subsequently murdered.

A few days later, Burmese troops from the same base captured a Thai fishing boat that had strayed close to Christie Island. The 22 Burmese and Thai fishermen on board were shot and buried on the island.

See also
List of islands of Burma
List of countries by southernmost point

References

External links
Myanmar Ecotourism - Ministry of Hotels and Tourism
Mergui Archipelago Photos

Mergui Archipelago